Moldova has never participated in the Turkvision Song Contest. Moldova was expected to participate in the  contest in Istanbul, Turkey, however the 2016 contest was subsequently cancelled due to the December 2016 Istanbul bombings. Moldova had selected the song "Yallah Yallah!", performed by Pelageya Stefoglo (then known as Polina Stefoglo), as their debut entry. Moldova are expected to participate in the upcoming  contest, held online in Istanbul. Pelageya Stefoglo was again internally selected as the Moldovan artist.

The national broadcaster responsible for the selection process of Moldova's participants is unknown, save for the initials "KTRK".

History

2016

Stefoglo had unsuccessfully competed to represent  in the contest before her selection as the Moldovan artist. "Yallah Yallah!" was announced as the Moldovan entry for the contest on 5 December 2016. However, the contest was later cancelled due to the December 2016 Istanbul bombings.

2020

Moldova's participation in the  contest, with Pelageya Stefoglo as their artist, was confirmed in November 2020.

Participation overview

See also 
 Moldova in the Eurovision Song Contest – A song contest organised by the EBU.
 Moldova in the Eurovision Young Musicians – A competition organised by the EBU for musicians aged 18 years and younger.
 Moldova in the Junior Eurovision Song Contest – A song contest for children, organised by the EBU.

References

Countries in the Turkvision Song Contest
Turkvision